Vice Admiral Vicente Merino Bielich (1889–1977) was a Chilean naval officer and political figure. He commanded the Chilean Navy during World War II, and the Battle of the Caribbean.

The son of Navy Captain Vicente Merino Jarpa, he was acting president of Chile between August 3 and 13, 1946.

References

1889 births
1977 deaths
Heads of state of Chile
Chilean admirals
Vice presidents of Chile
Chilean people of Croatian descent
20th-century Chilean Navy personnel